Sesame Park is the Canadian version of Sesame Street co-produced by Sesame Workshop and the Canadian Broadcasting Corporation.

The series originally functioned as a re-edited version of the original American series, and was named Sesame Street Canada and later, Canadian Sesame Street, with some of the segments replaced with ones produced in Canada and later featuring Canadian-exclusive Muppet characters. In 1996, the series adopted a new format and was renamed Sesame Park.

Canadian Sesame Street

Daniel McCarthy, the director of the CBC Sesame Street Project, developed Sesame Street Canada for CBC Television. The series, which debuted in 1972, was originally a hybrid of American and Canadian production segments. McCarthy partnered with the Children's Television Workshop (now known as Sesame Workshop) to introduce new, CBC-produced segments to the show's original American footage. McCarthy introduced distinct Canadian themes and set designs to the show. He brought in Canadian entertainers and personalities to film segments aimed at Canadian children. McCarthy also introduced basic French language lessons created specifically for Sesame Street Canada as well.

Between 1972 and 1995, the series, originally known as Sesame Street Canada and later Canadian Sesame Street, became an institution for preschool Canadian children. During the 1970s and 1980s it anchored a three-show block that included Friendly Giant (later replaced by Fred Penner's Place) and Mr. Dressup.

In 1972, the bulk of Sesame Street'''s content was licensed out to CBC Television, originally as five-minute interstitials during "commercial" breaks. CBC then added live-action and animated segments teaching about Canadian culture and French bilingualism, replacing segments on Spanish and American history on the original program. (Some Spanish segments still aired in Canada, although fewer in number and usually related to the show's Hispanic main-cast characters, Maria and Luis). Most of the production of the Canadian segments took place in Vancouver, Winnipeg, Toronto, Halifax, and Montreal. The American Sesame Street occasionally featured Canadian guests as well, such as Saskatchewan-born singer Buffy Sainte-Marie.

In 1981, the amount of Canadian content per show was increased to 30 minutes. In 1987, a series of specially made Canadian Muppet characters were introduced, including Basil the Bear (played by Bob Stutt), French-Canadian Louis the Otter, Dodi, a bush pilot, and Katie, a girl in a wheelchair.

The Henson Muppet shop also provided some Anything Muppets which could be redressed to become whatever characters the script called for, including Barbara Plum (a parody of CBC broadcasting legend Barbara Frum). Beau Beaver, an animated character, would discuss national symbols, particularly those appearing on Canadian money.

Sesame Park
 
In 1996, the CBC decided to take on the job of producing different kinds of content for the series; specifically to have their own "street". Producer Shirley Greenfield and screenwriter Jill Golick decided to set the show in a park, rather than on an urban street. A new half-hour series entitled Sesame Park was born. In addition to three or four segments set in the park, each episode also consisted of almost entirely Canadian segments with only occasional American ones, most commonly featuring Bert and Ernie. Added to the cast was a Muppet kitten named Chaos (who is similar to Elmo, serving the same role, and is named after Golick's own cat) and a human character named Ray. Many guests made appearances on the series, including Red Green, a Canadian situation-comedy character played by Steve Smith, and Eric Peterson as Old King Cole.

The series joined the CBC Playground lineup on October 21, along with Wimzie's House.

In 1999, the series received its nomination and win from the Gemini Awards, for Best Preschool Program or Series (Wendy Smith, Susan Sheehan, Duncan Lamb). Bob Stutt was nominated that year for Best Performance in a Preschool Program or Series. In 2000, Sheila McCarthy won Best Performance in a Preschool Program or Series, for her role in an episode of the show, beating out fellow guest star Pier Kohl, as well as others. In 2001, the series won Best Preschool Program or Series (Wendy Smith, Susan Sheehan, Duncan Lamb), beating out Land O' Hands and The Nook Counting Network. Guest Eric Peterson won again for Best Performance in a Preschool Program or Series, beating out Pier Kohl, James Rankin, Natasha LaForce and Gisèle Corinthios.

As with the original Sesame Street, some segments of Canadian Sesame Street and Sesame Park were farmed out to other versions of Sesame Street, in particular, Sésamo, the Latin American version of Sesame Street. In addition, since the rise of cable television in Canada in the 1970s (and before that for communities close to the US border), the original American Sesame Street could still be viewed on PBS-affiliated stations.Sesame Park was cancelled in 2001 for undisclosed reasons.

After the cancellationSesame Street now airs on Treehouse TV and Specials on Global Television Network, a Canadian channel aimed at preschoolers. Various segments, including Global Grover and Elmo's World, have aired separately on the channel for many years after Open Sesame''.

Cast
 Tim Gosley - Basil the Polar Bear (1987–1996)
 Trish Leeper - Katie, Barbara Plum
 Rob Mills - Dodi (1987–1996), Garth Burmengi
 Pier Paquette (as Pier Kohl) - Louis the Otter
 Derek Ritschel - Ray
 Gord Robertson - Dodi (assistance in flying sequences)
 Bob Stutt - Basil the Polar Bear (1996–2001)
 Karen Valleau - Chaos the Cat
 Noreen Young - Dodi (1996–2001)
 Marty Stelnick

References

External links

 
 

1972 Canadian television series debuts
Canadian television shows featuring puppetry
CBC Kids original programming
2001 Canadian television series endings
1970s Canadian children's television series
1980s Canadian children's television series
1990s Canadian children's television series
2000s Canadian children's television series
Sesame Street international co-productions
1970s preschool education television series
1980s preschool education television series
1990s preschool education television series
2000s preschool education television series
Canadian preschool education television series
Canadian television series based on American television series